Otto Lehmann may refer to:

 Otto Lehmann (physicist) (1855–1922), German physicist
 Otto Lehmann (movie producer) (1889–1968), German movie producer